Kenneth Ernest "Ernie" Gillatt was an English professional association footballer who played as an inside forward during the 1920s.

References

People from Leyburn
English footballers
Association football forwards
Leyton Orient F.C. players
Burnley F.C. players
Mansfield Town F.C. players
Barnsley F.C. players
English Football League players
Year of birth missing
Year of death missing
Sportspeople from Yorkshire